The Scotts Peak Dam Road is the most southerly point of road access into Southwest National Park, Tasmania, Australia.

The road was built by the Hydro-Electricity Commission of Tasmania with funding from the Australian Government to facilitate the construction of dams for the flooding of Lake Pedder. It was an unsealed road built to connect between the dam works and the Gordon River Road. The  road leaves the Gordon River Road at Frodshams Pass and heads south and provides access to Edgar Dam and the Scotts Peak Dam across the Huon River. The road terminates at the Huon Campground, an access point for the Frankland Range and the South Coast region of the South West Wilderness.

References

Roads in Tasmania
Tasmania road articles with KML
Gordon River power development scheme